The men's team competition of the 2013 World Judo Championships was held on September 1.

Medalists

References

External links
 

Mteam
World Men's Team Judo Championships
World 2013